The men's K-1 1000 metres canoe sprint competition at the 2015 European Games in Baku took place between 14 and 15 June at the Kur Sport and Rowing Centre in Mingachevir.

Schedule
The schedule was as follows:

All times are Azerbaijan Summer Time (UTC+5)

Results

Heats
The six fastest boats in each heat, plus the three fastest remaining boats advanced to the semifinals.

Heat 1

Heat 2

Heat 3

Heat 4

Semifinals
The fastest three boats advanced to the A final. The next three fastest boats advanced to the B final.

Semifinal 1

Semifinal 2

Semifinal 3

Finals

Final B
Competitors in this final raced for positions 10 to 18.

Final A
Competitors in this final raced for positions 1 to 9, with medals going to the top three.

References

Men's K-1 1000 metres